The Luwo (also called Jur Chol  and Luo of Bahr el Ghazal) are a Nilotic ethnic group that live in the western parts of South Sudan. They are part of a larger group of ethno-linguistically related Luo peoples of East Africa. They speak the Jur language which is a Northern Luo language.

They are related to the Dholuo speaking Joluo of Kenya and Tanzania. The date of divergence is estimated to have been about eight centuries ago. their closest relatives however, are the Anyuak,Pari and Shilluk

Name 
The Luwo are known to the Dinka as Jur Chol which is an exonym taken from the Dinka language (compare Jur Beli). Some Luo politicians object to the name.

Culture 
The Luo reside in their lands Piluwo or Luwo Land in the Jur River and Wau counties of Western Bahr el Ghazal State and in Aweil Center County of Northern Bahr el Ghazal State. The Luo are also sedentary, meaning they have a centralized living area. They grow sorghum, cassava, sweet potatoes, and beans. They can fish, hunt, and beekeep, making them a well-rounded society.

Population
The Luwo are one of the smaller tribes of South Sudan with population about 171,000 - by some accounts the Luo are the 8th largest ethnic group in South Sudan. They may be found in Aweil, Wau and Tonj states or in Tonj and Western Bahr el Ghazal and Northern Bahr el Ghazal states by the pre-2015 organisation.

A census conducted in 1983 put their population at 80,000.

Notable people

Joseph Ukel Abango, former Minister of General Education in South Sudan
Gen James Ajonga Mawut, Army Chief of Staff in the Sudan People's Liberation Army
Elias Waya Nyipuoc, first Governor of Wau State
Mark Nyipuoch, former Governor of Western Bahr el Ghazal and Current Deputy Speaker of South Sudan's National Legislative Assembly 
Mary Jarvis Yak, Deputy Minister of Finance in South Sudan
 Archbishop Erneu Dut Wien, First South Sudanese Roman Catholic Bishop and Archbishop.
 Jarvis Yak, First South Sudanese Khartoum governor in 1960s.
 Joseph Garang, First South Sudanese to Graduate from Faculty of Law
 Mathiang Muo
 Pione Sisto

References

Ethnic groups in South Sudan